Moving August is a 2002 American comedy film directed by Christopher Fink and starring Eddie McClintock, Sarah Wynter, Josh Holloway, and Alexandra Adi.

Plot
The pretty and quirky interior designer Michelle Kelly (Sarah Wynter) has convinced her struggling photographer boyfriend, August Loder (Eddie McClintock) to finally move in with her. On the same morning they're moving August out, the girl moving in mistakenly arrives to move in... she's a hot looking free-spirit named Hunter (Alexandra Adi) and August falls in love with her at first sight. August and Hunter decide to help each other move in and out. Throughout the day, their two very outrageous groups of friends tangle through conflicts and sex while August tries to decide which girl he wants to be with before it's too late.

Cast
Eddie McClintock . . . . . .   August Loder
Sarah Wynter . . . . . . Michelle Kelly
Josh Holloway . . . . . .  Loren Carol
Alexandra Adi . . . . . .   Hunter Davis
Brenda Bakke . . . . . .   Ginny Forster
Todd Tesen . . . . . .   Joe Peck
Gavin Perry . . . . . .   Adam Loder
Christopher Fink . . . . . .  Shopping Cart Guy

External links

2002 films
2002 comedy films
American independent films
American comedy films
2002 independent films
2000s English-language films
2000s American films